The Chupadera springsnail, scientific name Pyrgulopsis chupaderae, is a species of minute freshwater snails with an operculum, aquatic gastropod molluscs or micromolluscs in the family Hydrobiidae.

This species' natural habitat is springs.
Bosque del Apache National Wildlife Refuge headquarters, New Mexico, United States.

Description
Its differentiated from other Pyrgulopsis in that its penial filament has a medium length lobe and medium length filament with the penial ornament consisting of an elongate penial gland; curved, transverse terminal gland; and ventral gland.

References

Endemic fauna of the United States
Pyrgulopsis
Gastropods described in 1987
Taxonomy articles created by Polbot